Vladimir Tarasov (born 21 March 1968) is a Russian ice hockey player. He competed in the men's tournament at the 1994 Winter Olympics.

Career statistics

Regular season and playoffs

International

References

1968 births
Living people
Olympic ice hockey players of Russia
Ice hockey players at the 1994 Winter Olympics
Sportspeople from Novosibirsk